Caroline Victoria Gipps (born 2 February 1948) was Vice-chancellor of the University of Wolverhampton from 2005 to 2011.

Gipps read Psychology at Bristol University and before her appointment at Wolverhampton had been dean of research at the Institute of Education and Deputy Vice-chancellor at Kingston University.

References

1948 births
Living people
Academics of Kingston University
Academics of the UCL Institute of Education
Vice-Chancellors by university in England
People associated with the University of Wolverhampton
Alumni of the University of Bristol
Place of birth missing (living people)
Women academic administrators